Illustreret Nyhedsblad was a Norwegian weekly magazine, issued from 1851 to 1866 in Christiania, Norway. Its first editor was Paul Botten-Hansen, who edited the magazine from 1851 to 1864 and from 1865 to 1866, with Frederik Bætzmann being editor from 1864 to 1865. Jonas Lie was the editor of the magazine from 1863 to 1864. Among its contributors were Bjørnstjerne Bjørnson, Henrik Ibsen, Ernst Sars and Camilla Collett. The latter published her writings about the visits to the European cities in the period between December 1863 and July 1864. Ibsen's plays Hærmændene paa Helgeland and Kærlighedens komedie were published as supplements to the magazine.

References

External links

1851 establishments in Norway
1866 disestablishments in Norway
Defunct literary magazines published in Europe
Defunct magazines published in Norway
Literary magazines published in Norway
Magazines established in 1851
Magazines disestablished in 1866
Magazines published in Oslo
Norwegian-language magazines
Weekly magazines published in Norway